This is a list of foreign ministers of Libya.

There are some notes which should be mentioned about this list:

Title of foreign minister varies depending on political regime. For example, during the Jamahiriya era (1977–2011), the title was Secretary of People's Committee for Foreign Communication and International Cooperation.
Despite that the list shown on website of Libyan foreign ministry are one of the sources used in this list, it omits some ministers, like Shams ad-Din Orabi, and Ali Hassanein, between Ahmad Bishti, and Salah Busir.

Ministers of Foreign Affairs of Libya

References
Mohamed Yousef el-Magariaf, "Libia bain al Madi wal Hadir: Safahat men at Tarikh as Siyasi", 4 vols., Markaz ad Dirasat al Libiya, Oxford,  2004.
Salem el Kebti, "Libia..Maseerat al Istiqlal…Watha'iq Mahalliya wa Dawliya", Part 3, 1st ed., 2012.
Libyan Foreign Ministry-List of Foreign Ministers (Arabic)
http://rulers.org/fm3.html

Foreign
Foreign Ministers
Politicians
 
Libya diplomacy-related lists
Libya politics-related lists